Ryan Dahl (born 1981) is an American software engineer who is best known for creating the Node.js JavaScript runtime as well as the Deno JavaScript/TypeScript runtime.

Biography 
Dahl grew up in San Diego, California. His mother bought him an Apple IIc when he was six years old, one of his first experiences with technology. Dahl attended a community college in San Diego and later transferred into UC San Diego where he studied mathematics. He went on to attend grad school for Mathematics at the University of Rochester where he studied algebraic topology, which he found "very abstract and beautiful" for a couple of years but later got bored of it because "it was not so applicable to real life".

Ruby work
After graduating, Dahl entered a Ph.D. program, but eventually dropped out, since he did not want to devote the rest of his life to mathematics. Instead, he left for South America, where he started developing web applications in Ruby.

Node.js
On May 27, 2009, Dahl released his project, the Node.js framework.

In January 2012, after having worked on the Node.js project since 2009, Dahl announced that he would step away from the project and turn operational management over to NPM creator and former Joyent employee Isaac Z. Schlueter.

Dahl gave the following reason for moving on from the project:

Deno
In 2018, Dahl announced Deno, a JavaScript/TypeScript runtime built with V8.

See also
Node.js
Deno

References

External links 

Living people
People associated with JavaScript
American software engineers
21st-century American inventors
1981 births